SeAH Holdings (Korean: 세아홀딩스) is a South Korean diversified holding company. Headquartered in Seoul, South Korea, it was split from SeAH Steel Corporation in 2001. Lee Tae-sung is its CEO.

The company's main business area is special steel. Its current investments include SeAH Besteel, SeAH CSS, SeAH Special Steel, SeAH Engineering and SeAH Metal, among others.

Holdings

SeAH Besteel 
SeAH Besteel (formerly Kia Steel) was acquired by the group in 2003, being the first big investment of SeAH Holdings. It mainly manufactures special steel bars, forged steel bars and automotive parts.

SeAH Besteel incorporated POSCO Specialty Steel in 2015 and formed SeAH Changwon Integrated Special Steel Corp. (also known as SeAH CSS). As for 2017, The company produced 3 million tonnes of crude steel. It is currently South Korea's largest special steel manufacturer with a domestic market share of over 40%.

SeAH Special Steel 
Founded under the name of Changwon Steel, it was taken over by the SeAH Group in 1998. The company produces special steel materials, such as CHQ wire, STS bars and CD bars. It was listed on the Korea Stock Exchange in 2011.

Other investments 

 SeAH ESAB
 SeAH M&S
 SeAH L&S
 SeAH Aerospace & Defense
 SeAH Global Thailand
 Qingdao SeAH Precision Metal
 Suzhou SeAH Precision Metal
 Foshan SeAH Precision Metal
 India SeAH Precision Metalf
 SeAH Precision Metal (Thailand)
 SeAH Precision Metal Indonesia
 SeAH Precision Mexico
 SeAH Automotive (Nantong)
 POS-SeAH Steel Wire (Nantong)
 POS-SeAH Steel Wire (Tianjin)
 POS-SeAH Steel Wire (Thailand)
 ESAB SeAH welding Products (Yantai)
 Irongrey

References 

Companies based in Seoul
Chaebol
Companies listed on the Korea Exchange
South Korean companies established in 2001
Holding companies established in 2001
Holding companies of South Korea